Castellaniella ginsengisoli is a Gram-negative, oxidase- and catalase-positive, rod-shaped, motile, beta-glucosidase-producing bacterium from the genus Castellaniella which has been isolated from soil of a ginseng field in South Korea. Colonies of Castellaniella ginsengisoli are yellow coloured.

References

External links
Type strain of Castellaniella ginsengisoli at BacDive -  the Bacterial Diversity Metadatabase

Burkholderiales
Bacteria described in 2009